Albert Bedouce (8 January 1869, Toulouse – 4 August 1947, Paris) was a French politician. He joined at first the French Workers' Party (POF), which in 1902 merged into the Socialist Party of France (PSdF), which in turn merged into the French Section of the Workers' International (SFIO) in 1905. Bedouce was a member of the Chamber of Deputies from 1906 to 1919 and from 1924 to 1940. He was Minister of Public Works from 1936 to 1937. In the 1939 presidential election Bedouce was the candidate of the SFIO, but lost to Albert Lebrun, the candidate of the Democratic Republican Alliance. On 10 July 1940, he voted in favour of granting the Cabinet presided by Marshal Philippe Pétain authority to draw up a new constitution, thereby effectively ending the French Third Republic and establishing Vichy France. For this he was expelled from the SFIO after the Liberation of France. In 1945 he joined, with his associate Émile Berlia, the newly founded Democratic Socialist Party (PSD).

References

External link

1869 births
1947 deaths
Politicians from Toulouse
French Workers' Party politicians
Socialist Party of France (1902) politicians
French Section of the Workers' International politicians
Democratic Socialist Party (France) politicians
Government ministers of France
Members of the 9th Chamber of Deputies of the French Third Republic
Members of the 10th Chamber of Deputies of the French Third Republic
Members of the 11th Chamber of Deputies of the French Third Republic
Members of the 13th Chamber of Deputies of the French Third Republic
Members of the 14th Chamber of Deputies of the French Third Republic
Members of the 15th Chamber of Deputies of the French Third Republic
Members of the 16th Chamber of Deputies of the French Third Republic